Frederick B. Cooke   (1873–1923) was an American outfielder in Major League Baseball who played in the late 19th century. He managed the Fort Wayne Indians of the Interstate League in 1897.

External links

1873 births
1923 deaths
Major League Baseball outfielders
Baseball players from Illinois
Cleveland Spiders players
19th-century baseball players
Lebanon Cedars players
Reading Actives players
Harrisburg Senators players
Fall River Indians players
Findlay Sluggers players
Jackson Jaxons players
Toledo Mud Hens players
Tacoma Rabbits players
Tacoma Colts players
Youngstown Puddlers players
Mobile Blackbirds players
Minor league baseball managers